Charles Vickers may refer to:

 Charles Geoffrey Vickers (1894–1982), English lawyer, administrator, writer and systems scientist
 Charles Vickers (footballer) (1891–1917), Scottish footballer